Sabina Orellana Cruz (born 1970) is a Bolivian unionist and politician of Quechua origin serving as Minister of Cultures, Decolonization and Depatriarchalization since 20 November 2020. She is a member of the Bartolina Sisa Confederation of indigenous women.

Biography 
Sabina Orellana was born in 1970. Of Quechua origin, she was raised in Vacas, Cochabamba. From 1993 to 2004, Orellana worked as a reporter for Radio Chualake dealing with issues of the environment, municipalities, education, health, and gender. In addition, she assumed responsibilities as a leader of the Departmental Federation of Women of Cochabamba.

From 2005 to 2008, Orellana was a leading member of the Bartolina Sisa Confederation of women. From 1995, she was a member of a faction within the Assembly for the Sovereignty of the Peoples (ASP) which eventually split into the Movement for Socialism (MAS).

Minister of Cultures 
On 20 November 2020, President Luis Arce restored the Ministry of Cultures and Tourism which had been dissolved by the previous administration of Jeanine Áñez on 4 June. The Ministry was redubbed the Ministry of Cultures, Decolonization and Depatriarchalization with the stated intention to "decolonize and de-patriarchalize [and to] reverse this inequality between nationalities, as well as between men and women." Sabina Orellana was appointed to head the ministry making her the only indigenous representative within the Arce cabinet.

Political positions  
In addition, Orellana declared that during her tenure in the ministry, she would work to promote the Wiphala as a national symbol, regretting that it had been burned during the 2019 crisis after the resignation of the president Evo Morales.

On 19 May 2021, Orellana publicly asked the Ministry of Foreign Affairs of Bolivia to proceed to cut Bolivia–United States relations, claiming that the government in Washington "attacks Bolivian sovereignty".

References 

1970 births
Living people
21st-century Bolivian politicians
21st-century Bolivian women politicians
Bolivian trade unionists
Culture ministers of Bolivia
Luis Arce administration cabinet members
Movement for Socialism (Bolivia) politicians
People from Arani Province
Women government ministers of Bolivia